A constitutional referendum was held in the Kingdom of Romania on 24 February 1938 to approve a new constitution granting dictatorial powers to King Carol II. Voting was done by answering yes or no before an election bureau, with silence marked as yes. Voting was compulsory, and the amendments were approved by 99.87% of voters. The voting process has been described as deeply flawed and characterized by widespread intimidation.

Background
The proposed changes to the constitution included:
Giving the King the power to legislate and sole power to amend the constitution
Making the government solely responsible to the King
Allowing the King to dissolve Parliament at any time and rule by decree
Limiting the Parliament to bringing in laws in the "national interest"
Making the second chamber 50% appointed by the King and the remainder from professional organisations
Raising the voting age from 21 to 30
Prohibiting "revolutionary propaganda"

Results

References

1938 referendums
1938 in Romania
1938
February 1938 events